Dato' Seri Ir. Mohammad Nizar bin Jamaluddin (born 17 March 1957) is a Malaysian politician and engineer who has served as Member of the Perak State Executive Council (EXCO) in the Pakatan Harapan (PH) and Barisan Nasional (BN) state administrations under Menteris Besar Ahmad Faizal Azumu and Saarani Mohamad from May 2018 to the collapse of the PH state administration in March 2020 and again since November 2022 as well as Member of the Perak State Legislative Assembly (MLA) for Sungai Rapat since May 2018. He served as the 10th Menteri Besar of Perak from March 2008 to the collapse of the Pakatan Rakyat (PR) state administration in February 2009, MLA for Changkat Jering from May 2013 to May 2018, for Pasir Panjang from March 2008 to May 2013 and the Member of Parliament (MP) for the Bukit Gantang from April 2009 to May 2013. He is a member of the National Trust Party (AMANAH), a component party of the PH coalition and was a member of the Malaysian Islamic Party (PAS), a former component party of the PR coalition. He is also presently the sole Perak AMANAH MLA.

Personal life 
Nizar is the son of a Malay father and a Chinese mother, and was raised in a Malay-Muslim household. Nizar is married to Datin Seri Fatimah Taat with whom he has eight children. Since 2009 he has resided in Sungai Rokam, Perak. Prior to his current residence, he resided at the official residence for the Menteri Besar at Jalan Raja DiHilir. He was asked to vacate by the state secretary, Datuk Abdul Rahman Hashim, in 2009.

Nizar is an engineering graduate from Aston University in Birmingham, United Kingdom. He took over the chief minister post from Datuk Seri DiRaja Tajol Rosli Mohd. Ghazali of Barisan Nasional.

Political career
Nizar was appointed as Menteri Besar on 17 March 2008 but was ousted in January 2009. He was the first Menteri Besar of Perak not from the Barisan Nasional coalition. His appointment followed the 2008 general election, in which the Pakatan Rakyat coalition, comprising the Democratic Action Party (DAP), the Parti Keadilan Rakyat (PKR) and his own party, PAS, won a majority of the seats in the Perak State Legislative Assembly. Appointed by the Crown Prince of Perak Raja Nazrin Shah over two other candidates, Datuk Ngeh Koo Ham and Jamaluddin Mohd Radzi, his appointment was initially controversial, as his party was the smallest of the three Pakatan Rakyat parties in the state assembly. He was removed as Menteri Besar just over a year later, following defections from Pakatan Rakyat coalition to Barisan Nasional that gave the latter a majority in the assembly and sparked a constitutional crisis.

Appointment as Menteri Besar

On 8 March 2008, the Pakatan Rakyat coalition in Perak won 31 seats of the 59 seat Perak State Assembly, which enabled it to form a majority state government before being unseated in the 2009 constitutional crisis.. The Democratic Action Party (DAP) commanded the most seats out of the 31 seats held by Pakatan Rakyat and were the claimants to the post of Menteri Besar. However, the Perak State Constitution stipulated that the Menteri Besar must be of Malay descent, and a non-Malay could only be appointed by a royal waiver by the Perak Palace. To resolve this, all three parties sent their nominations for the MB post to the Regent of Perak, Raja Nazrin Shah. Nizar was chosen over Ngeh Koo Ham of the DAP and Jamaluddin Mohd Radzi of People's Justice Party (PKR) on 12 March 2008 by Raja Nazrin, and sworn in on 17 March 2008 at Istana Iskandariah, Kuala Kangsar. Nizar was the first person not part of the Barisan National coalition to hold such a post in Perak.

The appointment of Nizar created a minor stir within the opposition coalition after the DAP's central executive committee, under the advice of Lim Kit Siang ordered Perak DAP state assemblymen to boycott the swearing-in ceremony to be held on 13 March 2008. Raja Nazrin then ordered a delay of the swearing in ceremony and asked all 31 of Pakatan Rakyat's assemblymen to pledge their support of Nizar's appointment, since otherwise Nizar is shown as not having majority support and therefore cannot be appointed as the Menteri Besar. Lim has since apologised and stated that he did not mean to disrespect the decision of the sultan and the regent of Perak. Following the resolution of this matter, all the state assemblymen from PKR, PAS and DAP (including Lim Kit Siang) attended the Menteri Besar swearing-in ceremony in support of Nizar.

Controversy and crisis

Administration as Menteri Besar
Nizar's administration granted freehold title to ethnic Chinese landholders in the settlements called as New Villages (Kampung Baru) in Perak. The Malaysian Deputy Prime Minister, Dato' Seri Najib Tun Razak disputed the state government's ability to grant the freehold titles, instead saying that the jurisdiction lied federally. Almost every act of his administration was criticised by the Malaysian mainstream press, especially by Utusan Malaysia and Berita Harian, an UMNO-owned, Malay-nationalist newspaper.

Nizar's administration was hounded by constant accusations of being a proxy to the DAP which had the majority seats in the State Assembly. In particular he was accused of being a puppet DAP's Datuk Ngeh Koo Ham and Nga Kor Ming, senior exco members in his cabinet.

2009 Perak constitutional crisis

In July 2008, former Perak MB Datuk Seri DiRaja Tajol Rosli Mohd. Ghazali claimed that the Pakatan Rakyat state government in Perak will fall on 31 August 2008 – Malaysia's Independence day through defections to Barisan Nasional from the PR camp – a clear corruption of PR leader Datuk Seri Anwar Ibrahim's 16 September 2008 plan to engineer mass defections of BN MPs from Sabah and Sarawak to form the new federal government. Nizar dismissed Tajol's claims and remarked "Who is he (Tajol) to predict the future?".

On 25 January 2009, BN's MLA from the Bota constituency, Datuk Nasarudin Hashim announced his defection from UMNO, a BN component party, to PKR, the second largest party in Nizar's Perak PR coalition. Nasarudin said that his decision was fully supported by his constituents and reaffirmed that no monetary award was offered to him by PR. Nizar and Anwar supported and welcomed Nasarudin into the PR coalition and Anwar claimed more BN MLAs were going to defect to PR a few days later. Nizar then claimed that three more MLAs from UMNO would defect to PR After Nasarudin's resignation from UMNO, Perak UMNO chief and former MB Tajol Rosli resigned as Perak BN chairman and Perak UMNO chief, taking responsibility for the defection of Nasarudin. Soon after, UMNO Malaysia Deputy President, Datuk Seri Najib Tun Razak, who is also the Malaysian Deputy Prime Minister took over as Perak UMNO chairman and Perak BN chairman from Tajol Rosli.

Crossover of Nasarudin and three other Perak assemblymen from PR, and effectively and controversially ended the PR majority government. The new Perak government, under Datuk Dr. Zambry Abdul Kadir, swore in some executive councillors, but Nizar refused to bow down, and continued his daily routines. The speaker of the assembly, V. Sivakumar then suspended all BN executive councillors for "contempt of assembly" after a complaint by one assemblyman.

On 11 May 2009, the Kuala Lumpur High Court ruled that the Sultan could not constitutionally remove Nizar from office, and that Nizar had always been the rightful Menteri Besar. Nizar announced his intention to immediately meet with the Sultan to request dissolution of the state assembly, while Zambry Abdul Kadir, the intended Barisan Menteri Besar, stated he would vacate the state secretariat as soon as possible. However, Nizar ultimately lost the legal proceedings when, in February 2010, the Federal Court ruled Zambry to be the lawful Menteri Besar.

2014 criminal defamation charge
Nizar was charged in a nationwide dragnet in August 2014 for criminal defamation for allegedly making a speech in 2012 prior to the 2013 general election saying "I was informed that Najib will call all the army generals to do something if BN lost in the general election." The defamation case was settled on 26 July 2016, after Najib accepts Nizar's apology.

Notes

Election results

Honours
  :
  Knight Grand Commander of the Order of the Perak State Crown (SPMP) – Dato' Seri (2008)

References

1957 births
Living people
People from Kampar, Perak
People from Perak
Malaysian people of Malay descent
Malaysian people of Chinese descent
Malaysian Muslims
Malaysian engineers
Former Malaysian Islamic Party politicians
National Trust Party (Malaysia) politicians
Members of the Dewan Rakyat
Members of the Perak State Legislative Assembly
Perak state executive councillors
Chief Ministers of Perak
Leaders of the Opposition in the Perak State Legislative Assembly
Alumni of Aston University
21st-century Malaysian politicians